Joseph Peter "Speed" Breheney (June 29, 1893 – December 1, 1949) was a professional football player and coach with the Providence Steam Roller of the National Football League. Born in Ireland, he later changed the spelling of his name to Joe Braney. In 1924 Braney was the coach of the Steam Roller as they were still an independent team. He was replaced during the team's first season in the league, 1926, by Archie Golembeski just before the season began.

Prior to his professional career, Braney played at the college level while attending Syracuse and Fordham University. In 1915 he was a letter winner for the Orange, while in 1916 he earned a letter playing for the Rams.

References

External links
Syracuse University All-time Letterwinners

1893 births
1949 deaths
American football guards
American football tackles
Fordham Rams football players
Providence Steam Roller coaches
Providence Steam Roller players
Syracuse Orange football players